In the cable television industry, Multiplatform Service refers to the secure delivery of rich media, information and applications to any device, regardless of transport, distribution system or user interface, providing the consumer with flawless, integrated and user activity access and management of their entertainment and communication services.

Applications 
 Caller ID between TV and voice phone
 Video Phone:  Manage personal services from a web interface: ringtones, forwarding, v-mail boxes
 Location or Device Shifting of a program from one device to another at the same spot in the program. For example: watch a program on TV – pause – continue watching on another device, such as your PC or TV, in another room
 Multi-room Whole Home DVR services: record once and watch in any room on any device.
 Alerts for notification of program availability. Alerts can appear on other devices.  Alerts may also include options to record, tune or add to watch list
 PC to TV viewing: access content on the PC via the TV
 TV to PC viewing: access content on the TV via the PC
 Management setting preferences on one device (PC) for another device (TV), parental controls, manage accounts
 Personal programming capabilities: set recordings to your DVR from the phone
 Personalization: set preferences, set favorites, include zip codes for location services
 Communication:  email, voicemail consumption on multiple devices, social sites
 Network-DVR or Digital Locker: content is in the cloud
 Media Management: moving content throughout the home (using DLNA and other standards)
 Personalizing Advertising: targeted or addressable advertising
 Social Networking Applications: sharing of programming clips, scheduled recording, and real-time commentary during shows

References
http://www.multichannel.com/article/453840-Multiplatform_Usage_Soars_Around_World_Cup_ESPN_XP_Research.php

http://www.multichannel.com/article/455221-Disney_Channel_s_Mickey_Mouse_Special_Revs_Up_Multiplatform_Exposure.php

https://www.nytimes.com/2010/01/04/technology/04video.html?_r=1

Sources 
 http://www.multichannel.com/article/453840-Multiplatform_Usage_Soars_Around_World_Cup_ESPN_XP_Research.php
 http://www.multichannel.com/article/455221-Disney_Channel_s_Mickey_Mouse_Special_Revs_Up_Multiplatform_Exposure.php
 https://www.nytimes.com/2010/01/04/technology/04video.html?_r=1

Cable television technology